Lucas Joshua Van Berkel (born 29 November 1991) is a Canadian male volleyball player, He is part of the Canada men's national volleyball team. On club level he plays for United Volleys Rhein-Main. In June 2021, Van Berkel was named to Canada's 2020 Olympic team.

References

External links
 profile at FIVB.org
 
 

1991 births
Canadian men's volleyball players
Living people
Galatasaray S.K. (men's volleyball) players
Volleyball players at the 2020 Summer Olympics
Olympic volleyball players of Canada
Middle blockers